Jorge Castelblanco (born 23 September 1987) is a long-distance runner from Panama. At the 2016 Olympics he became the first Panamanian athlete to run the Olympic marathon. He also competed in the men's marathon at the 2020 Summer Olympics held in Tokyo, Japan.

Castelblanco graduated from the Technological University of Panama and works as a police officer. He is married and has a son Ethan.

References

External links
 

1987 births
Living people
Panamanian male long-distance runners
Panamanian male marathon runners
Olympic athletes of Panama
Athletes (track and field) at the 2016 Summer Olympics
Athletes (track and field) at the 2020 Summer Olympics
World Athletics Championships athletes for Panama
Olympic male marathon runners